East Valley High School, located in Yakima, Washington, is a high school that serves 830 students in grades 9–12. From 2012 to 2016, the principal was Dorthea Say and from 2016 to 2021, Kayla Crowe. The principal is now Ryan McDaniel, since 2021.

Demographics
50% of the students are white, while 45% are Hispanic, 1% are American Indian, 2% are Asian and 1% are black. And 1% are two or more races.

References

External links
East Valley H.S.
East Valley School District #90

Public high schools in Washington (state)
High schools in Yakima County, Washington
Schools in Yakima, Washington